Valiha diffusa is a bamboo species in the genus Valiha found in Madagascar.

Valiha diffusa is a locally useful wild source of construction material. The Madagascan valiha is a stringed tube zither traditionally made from the bamboo.

References

External links

diffusa